La Reina de la Noche (The Queen of the Night) is the second album by Latin American Idol winner Mayré Martínez. The album was produced independently by the singer's production company, Mayre Martinez Producciones. On October 22, 2009, the album was made available as a digital release in Amazon.com and iTunes.
On October 25, 2009, the album was released physically in Venezuela; a worldwide physical release is yet to be announced.

Track listing

Singles
The album has already released three promo singles, the most famous of them being "La Reina de la Noche".

La Reina de la Noche
The single was released in May 2008 with the intention to promote the forthcoming album. The song became an instant hit in Venezuela and in many other countries.
The song become the most downloaded of the three.

Dame 3
The song was released in late 2008 but failed to get the same attention as the previous single.

Hay Una Voz
"Hay Una Voz" is the third and last promo-only single from the album.

Mírame
"Mirame" has been announced as the fourth overall and the first fully released single from the album. Mayre Martinez started to promote the single by live performances and a music video, which has been cancelled.

Junto a Mí
"Junto a Mí" is the fifth single and the second fully released single from the album. This romantic ballad was announced as new single by Mayre Martinez on her official page Facebook. The music video for the song was released on June 21, 2010.

Charts

Release history

References

2009 albums
Mayré Martínez albums